Aaron Mark Hardie (born 7 January 1999) is an Australian cricketer. In January 2018, he was added to Australia's squad for the 2018 Under-19 Cricket World Cup, but was later ruled out of the tournament due to injury. In November 2018, he played for the Cricket Australia XI team in a four-day match against India at the Sydney Cricket Ground. During the match, he took the wicket of India's captain Virat Kohli, finishing with figures of four wickets for 50 runs in the first innings, and scored 86 runs while batting. Hardie described the experience as being "a bit surreal".

He made his Twenty20 debut for the Perth Scorchers in the 2018–19 Big Bash League season on 9 January 2019. He bowled one over, conceding thirteen runs, and did not bat, with the Perth Scorchers winning by six wickets. He made his first-class debut for Western Australia in the 2018–19 Sheffield Shield season on 20 March 2019. He made his List A debut on 23 October 2019, for Western Australia in the 2019–20 Marsh One-Day Cup. In March 2020, in round nine of the 2019–20 Sheffield Shield season, Hardie scored his maiden century in first-class cricket. In April 2022, in the final of the 2021–22 Sheffield Shield season, Hardie scored 174 not out, with Western Australia going on to win the tournament.

In June 2022, Hardie was signed by Surrey to play in the T20 Blast and County Championship in England.

References

External links
 

1999 births
Living people
Australian cricketers
Cricket Australia XI cricketers
Perth Scorchers cricketers
Western Australia cricketers
Surrey cricketers
Sportspeople from Bournemouth
Cricketers from Dorset